Alexander Clark was a businessman and ambassador.

Alexander Clark may also refer to:

Alexander Clark (rower)
Alexander Clark of Balbirnie, Scottish merchant and Provost of Edinburgh
Alexander Clark (football manager)

See also
Alex Clark (disambiguation)
Alexander Clarke (disambiguation)